Bonington may refer to:

People with the surname 
 Chris Bonington (born 1934), British mountaineer
 Richard Parkes Bonington (1802–1828), British landscape painter

Other uses 
 Bonington Halls, University of Nottingham, England
 Sutton Bonington, village in Nottinghamshire, England

See also 
Bonnington (disambiguation)